William Matthew Turner (February 18, 1967 – January 27, 2019) was a professional baseball relief pitcher who played in Major League Baseball from  through . He batted and threw right-handed. In a two-season career in Major League Baseball, Turner posted a 5–5 record with a 2.79 ERA and one save in 64 games.

Career
Turner was signed by the Atlanta Braves as a free agent in 1986. Then he was sent by Atlanta to the Houston Astros in 1991 in the same transaction that brought Jim Clancy to the Braves. On October 21, 1992, Turner became the first AAA to sign with the Florida Marlins. Turner made his major league debut with the Marlins in 1993 coming out from the bullpen. In 55 appearances, he went 4-5 with a 2.91 ERA and 59 strikeouts in 68.0 innings. After that, he was dealt by Florida to the Cleveland Indians before 1994, his last major league season. One highlight of Turner's brief MLB career occurred on April 13, 1994. In an extra inning Indians victory over the Angels, Turner pitched a perfect 10th inning to earn his one and only major league save.

Following his majors career, Turner pitched in the minors with the Wichita Wranglers (AA) and Omaha Royals (AAA), as well as the Wei Chuan Dragons (CPBL), and Langosteros de Cancun and Acereros de Monclova (LMB).

Turner died on January 27, 2019, at the age of 51 after a fourth and final battle with cancer.

References

External links
, or Retrosheet, or Venezuelan Winter League

1967 births
2019 deaths
Acereros de Monclova players
American expatriate baseball players in Canada
American expatriate baseball players in Mexico
Baseball players from Lexington, Kentucky
Buffalo Bisons (minor league) players
Burlington Braves players
Charlotte Knights players
Cleveland Indians players
Durham Bulls players
Edmonton Trappers players
Florida Marlins players
Greenville Braves players
Langosteros de Cancún players
Major League Baseball pitchers
Mexican League baseball pitchers
Navegantes del Magallanes players
American expatriate baseball players in Venezuela
Omaha Royals players
Pulaski Braves players
Richmond Braves players
Sioux City Explorers players
Sumter Braves players
Tucson Toros players
Deaths from cancer in Kentucky
Wei Chuan Dragons players
American expatriate baseball players in Taiwan